The United States Ambassador to Bulgaria is the ambassador extraordinary and plenipotentiary from the United States to Bulgaria.

Ambassadors

Diplomatic Agent

Envoy Extraordinary and Minister Plenipotentiary

Ambassador Extraordinary and Plenipotentiary

References

See also
Bulgaria - United States relations
Foreign relations of Bulgaria
Ambassadors of the United States
Bulgarian Ambassador to the United States

References
United States Department of State: Background notes on Bulgaria

External links
 United States Department of State: Chiefs of Mission for Bulgaria
 United States Department of State: Bulgaria
 United States Embassy in Sofia

 
Bulgaria
United States